Dischidodactylus colonnelloi is a species of frog in the family Craugastoridae. It is endemic to Venezuela and only know from its type locality, Cerro Marahuaca, in the Amazonas State. The holotype was collected by G. Colonnello, hence the specific name colonnelloi.

Description
The head is wider than long and rounded. The tympanum is inconspicuous. The fingers have lateral fringes but no webbing; the toes are one-third webbed. The dorsum is very dark gray, almost black, and dotted with many inconspicuous gray spots.

The female had 11 large (diameter ) eggs.

Habitat and conservation
Development is presumably direct. Threats to it are unknown. It occurs in the Duida-Marahuaca National Park.

References

Dischidodactylus
Amphibians of Venezuela
Endemic fauna of Venezuela
Amphibians described in 1985
Taxonomy articles created by Polbot
Taxa named by José Ayarzagüena
Amphibians of the Tepuis